FCM, or FMC in the context of chemotherapy is an acronym for a chemotherapy regimen that is often used in the treatment of indolent B cell non-Hodgkin's lymphomas.

In combination with Rituximab this regimen is called R-FCM or R-FMC, or FCM-R, FMC-R.

The [R]-FCM regimen contains
 (R)ituximab - anti-CD20 monoclonal antibody that can kill both normal and malignant CD20-bearing B cells;
 (F)ludarabine  - an antimetabolite;
 (C)yclophosphamide  - an alkylating antineoplastic agent from the oxazafosforine group;
 (M)itoxantrone  - a synthetic anthracycline analogue (anthraquinone) that can intercalate DNA, thereby preventing cell division.

The FCM or R-FCM regimen is also sometimes used in some autoimmune diseases that are inherently sensitive to the use of rituximab, fludarabine, mitoxantrone, and cyclophosphamide alone in monotherapies (e.g., in severe multiple sclerosis flares).

Dosing regimen

References 

Chemotherapy regimens used in lymphoma